Arturo León Lerma (born 1 March 1937) is a Mexican politician from the Institutional Revolutionary Party. From 2000 to 2003 he served as Deputy of the LVIII Legislature of the Mexican Congress representing Sonora.

After starting in the front office of the Mayos de Navojoa in the 1970s, León Lerma served as president of the Liga Mexicana del Pacífico from 1981 to 1985, and again from 1989 to 2000, before finishing his executive career with a 14-year stint with the Naranjeros de Hermosillo. He was inducted into the 2011 class of the Mexican Professional Baseball Hall of Fame as an executive.

References

1937 births
Living people
Politicians from Sonora
Institutional Revolutionary Party politicians
21st-century Mexican politicians
Mexican educators
Baseball executives
Mexican sports executives and administrators
National Autonomous University of Mexico alumni
People from Álamos
Members of the Chamber of Deputies (Mexico) for Sonora